Walter Roberts (23 November 1917 – March 2006) was a Welsh footballer who played as a wing-half. He made appearances in the English football league for Wrexham and Bournemouth & Boscombe Athletic.

References

1917 births
2006 deaths
Wrexham A.F.C. players
AFC Bournemouth players
Ellesmere Port Town F.C. players
Welsh footballers
Association football defenders